The 1992 Indiana gubernatorial election was held on November 3, 1992. Incumbent Governor Evan Bayh, a Democrat, won reelection over his Republican challenger, Linley E. Pearson with 62% of the vote. He was the first Democratic governor of Indiana to win reelection since governors became eligible for election to consecutive terms in office in 1972.

, this marks the last occasion that the following counties have voted Democratic in a gubernatorial election: Boone, Daviess, Elkhart, Hamilton, Hendricks, Huntington, Johnson, Kosciusko, Lawrence, Miami, Morgan, Union, Wabash, and Wells.

Primaries

Democratic
Incumbent Governor Evan Bayh was unopposed in the Democratic primary.

Republican
Candidates
Linley E. Pearson, Indiana Attorney General
H. Dean Evans, State Superintendent of Public Instruction 
John A. Johnson, former Republican nominee for Congress in the 5th District

Minor parties

New Alliance

The New Alliance Party nominated Mary Barton to be its gubernatorial candidate in 1992. Elmetta Wellington became the nominee for lieutenant governor.

General election
Bayh won the election with 62% of the popular vote to Pearson's 37%. Bayh's total in the popular vote was the largest in recent history.

References

Gubernatorial
Indiana gubernatorial elections
Indiana
Evan Bayh